Park is an unincorporated community in eastern Fayette County, Texas, United States.

External links
 PARK, TX Handbook of Texas Online.

Unincorporated communities in Fayette County, Texas
Unincorporated communities in Texas